Mathematical methods relating to successive approximation include the following:

 Babylonian method, for finding square roots of numbers
 Fixed-point iteration
  Means of finding zeros of functions:
 Halley's method
 Newton's method
 Differential-equation matters:
 Picard–Lindelöf theorem, on existence of solutions of differential equations
 Runge–Kutta methods, for numerical solution of differential equations

Approximation algorithms
Root-finding algorithms